Amr ibn Khalid al-Asadi Saydawi (عَمرو بن خالِد الاَسَدی الصَیداوی) was a Kufan companion of Hussain ibn Ali who participated in the Battle of Karbala.

On the day of Ashura 
Escaping the army of Ibn Ziad, Amr fled from Kufa accompanied by his servant Sa'd, Mujammi' ibn Abd Allah al-A'idhi and Nafi' ibn Hilal and with the guidance of Tirimmah joined the caravan of Hussain ibn Ali in Udhayb al-Hijanat. Hurr wanted to capture or return them, but Hussain prevented him from that.

On the Day of Ashura, Amr and his servant with some others first attacked the army of Umar ibn Sa'd, then the army of Umar ibn Sa'd besieged them. Abbas ibn Ali attacked the army of Umar ibn Sa'd and rescued them. They attacked once again and fought until they were all martyred in one place.

References 

Husayn ibn Ali
Hussainiya
People killed at the Battle of Karbala
600s births
680 deaths